Axel Larsson may refer to:

 Axel Larsson (Danish wrestler) (1885–1961), Danish Olympic wrestler
 Axel Larsson (Swedish wrestler) (1901–1984), Swedish Olympic wrestler